Yevgenyevka (derived from Yevgen'yevka) is a city in Almaty Region of south-eastern Kazakhstan.

Populated places in Almaty Region